Olabisi Onabanjo University Teaching Hospital (OOUTH) (formerly called, Ogun State University Teaching Hospital (OSUTH) is situated at Sagamu, Ogun State, South West Nigeria. The teaching hospital was established in the year 1986 with primary aim of teaching medical students from Olabisi Onabanjo University and provision of healthcare service to the indigene of Ogun state and Nigeria as a whole.

Overview
OOUTH was founded on 1 January 1986 in partnership with Obafemi Awolowo College Health Sciences to provide medical training for medical students of Olabisi Onabanjo University. The teaching hospital was located at the former State Hospital, Sagamu, Ogun State, Nigeria. The Chief Medical Director (CMD) of the hospital was Prof. A.A.O. Laditan. The hospital is managed by governing council appointed by the state government. , the chairman of the governing council is Professor Emmanuel O. Otolorin.

References

Hospital buildings completed in 1986
Teaching hospitals in Nigeria
Hospitals established in 1986
Sagamu
Olabisi Onabanjo University
1986 establishments in Nigeria
20th-century architecture in Nigeria